Hindustani Awam Morcha (Secular) (translation: Indian People's Front; abbreviated as HAM-S) is an Indian political party having presence in Bihar. HAM(S) got new symbol wok in Bihar Assembly Election 2020.

Formation

It was launched formally  on 8 May 2015 by former Chief Minister of Bihar, Jitan Ram Manjhi, who left the Janata Dal (United) along with 18 others to form the party following the 2015 Bihar political crisis. The name of the party was later changed to Hindustani Awam Morcha (Secular) (HAM-S). In July 2015, the Election Commission recognised the HAM-S as a political party. The election symbol of the party is a telephone.

History 

In July 2015, the party joined the NDA and contested 21 seats, with some additional  members contesting on the BJP ticket in Bihar. On 18 September 2015, Hindustani Awam Morcha announced its first list of 13 candidates with Manjhi contesting from Makhadumpur and Imamganj.

The party ended up winning only in Imamganj with Manjhi himself losing in Makhdumpur.

In the previous election, the alliance was led by the Bharatiya Janata Party alongside three smaller allies namely the Lok Janshakti Party, the Rashtriya Lok Samta Party and the Hindustani Awam Morcha, while the Janata Dal (United) had contested as part of the current opposition Mahagathbandan. In 2017, the Janata Dal (United) switched alliance which caused the Mahagathbandan government to fall and the National Democratic Alliance came to power. In 2018, two of the partners, the Rashtriya Lok Samata Party and the Hindustani Awam Morcha left the alliance.

 
During the campaigning phase in August 2020, the alliance was re-joined National Democratic Alliance. The party won four seats in Bihar Assembly elections 2020 and from the Manjhi's side his son Santosh Suman was made a minister in the Nitish Kumar's cabinet.

Prominent members
Jitan Ram Manjhi, founding member and former Chief Minister of Bihar, Member of Legislative Assembly from Imamganj.
Santosh Suman Manjhi, Minister of Irrigation and SC ST Welfare in Government of Bihar and Member of Legislative Council of Bihar.
Ramesh Singh,
Vice president of HAM party Hindustani awam morcha (secular), Ramesh singh one of the prominent member of Hindustani Awam Morcha.

Electoral performance

Lok Sabha Elections

Bihar Vidhan Sabha

List of Members of Legislative Assembly in Bihar

List of Members of Legislative Council of Bihar

See also 
 State Mahadalit Commission, Bihar
 Bhola Paswan Shastri 
 Ram Sundar Das
 2015 Bihar political crisis
 Bihar Legislative Assembly
 Bihar Assembly Election 2020

Notes

References 

 
Political parties in Bihar
Political parties established in 2015
2015 establishments in Bihar
Janata Parivar
Dalit politics